Morning With Sahir was a morning show airing on A-Plus Entertainment and was hosted by Sahir Lodhi

References

External links
A-plus.tv

A-Plus TV original programming
Television shows set in Lahore
2012 Pakistani television series debuts
Urdu-language television shows